Yara Martinez (born August 31, 1979) is an American television actress, born in Puerto Rico, who is  best known for her roles as Kelly in Hollywood Heights and as Dr. Luisa Alver on The CW series Jane the Virgin.

Early life
Martinez is Cuban-American, born in Puerto Rico, raised in Miami. Prior to acting, Martinez practiced ballet for ten years. She is the grandniece of prima ballerina Alicia Alonso.

Career
She began her career on television with guest-starring roles. In 2007, she had supporting role in film The Hitcher. She later returned to television and had number of guest and recurring roles on dramatic series. She played Mariella Moretta in the TNT crime drama, Southland from 2009 to 2011, and Theresa Lopez on the ABC Family drama, The Lying Game (2012–2013). She also had recurring roles on Vanished, The Unit, Breakout Kings, and Nashville.

Martinez was regular cast member on the short-lived primetime soap opera, Hollywood Heights in 2012. In 2013 she began starring in the Amazon comedy series, Alpha House. In 2014, Martinez also was cast as recurring in The CW comedy-drama Jane the Virgin, and HBO crime drama True Detective. Martinez portrayed Ms. Lint in the Amazon series, The Tick. Martinez stars as Dr. Paula Reyes in the Fox series Deputy. After playing the recurring character Isabella "Izzy" Colón for the first four seasons of the CBS legal drama Bull, Martinez was upgraded to series regular for season 5 (2020–21).

Filmography

References

External links
 

American entertainers of Cuban descent
21st-century American actresses
1979 births
American soap opera actresses
American television actresses
Living people
American actresses of Puerto Rican descent
Actresses from Miami